The 1987 Amílcar Cabral Cup was held in Conakry, Guinea.

Group stage

Group A

Group B

Knockout stage

Semi-finals

Fifth place match

Third place match

Final

References
RSSSF archives

Amílcar Cabral Cup